The Muslim conquest of Egypt, led by the army of 'Amr ibn al-'As, took place between 639 and 646 AD and was overseen by the Rashidun Caliphate. It ended the seven-century-long period of Roman reign over Egypt that began in 30 BC. Byzantine rule in the country had been shaken, as Egypt had been conquered and occupied for a decade by the Sasanian Empire in 618–629, before being recovered by the Byzantine emperor Heraclius. The caliphate took advantage of Byzantines' exhaustion and captured Egypt ten years after its reconquest by Heraclius.

During the mid-630s, the Romans had already lost the Levant and its Ghassanid allies in Arabia to the Caliphate. The loss of the prosperous province of Egypt and the defeat of the Byzantine armies severely weakened the empire, resulting in further territorial losses in the centuries to come.

Background
With the death of Muhammad in 632 AD, the Muslim world began a period of rapid expansion. Under the rule of the first caliphs, the Rashidun, Muslim armies began assaulting the borders of both Sassanid Persia and the Byzantine Empire. Neither of the two former powers was prepared for the aggressive expansion of the Arabs, as both largely underestimated Islam and its growing support; this is best depicted by the ambivalent views held by the Byzantines and the painstakingly slow reaction of the Sassanids. After smashing both the Byzantines at Yarmuk (636) and the Persians at Qadisiyah (637), the Caliphate set its sights south towards the rich provinces of Byzantine Africa. After the Siege of Jerusalem, ‘Amr suggested an invasion of Egypt to the Caliph, stating that ‘There is no country in the world at once so wealthy and so defenceless’. In addition, he pointed out that the Roman governor of Jerusalem, Aretion, had fled to Egypt.

Egypt at the time had just recently been conquered by the Sasanian Empire and retaken by treaty. The Chalcedonian Schism had torn the empire between Chalcedonians and non-Chalcedonians, with most of Egypt's population being non-Chalcedonian. The emperor, Heraclius was a Chalcedonian, and had appointed Cyrus as both the Chalcedonian Patriarch of Alexandria (unrecognised by the Egyptians) and the praefectus Aegypti. Cyrus enstated a ten-year-long reign of terror in an attempt to bring the Egyptians to Chalcedonianism, forcing them to pray in secret and torturing many to death. The Coptic Pope, Pope Benjamin I, was in hiding throughout this, and ruthlessly but unsuccessfully pursued by Cyrus.

Rashidun invasion of Egypt

Crossing the Egyptian border

In December 639, 'Amr ibn al-'As left for Egypt with a force of 4,000 troops. Most of the soldiers belonged to the Arab tribe of 'Ak, but Al-Kindi mentioned that one third of the soldiers belonged to the Arab tribe of Ghafik. The Arab soldiers were also joined by some Roman and Persian converts to Islam. However, 'Umar, the Muslim caliph, reconsidered his orders to Amr and considered it foolhardy to expect to conquer such a large country as Egypt with a mere 4,000 soldiers. Accordingly, he wrote a letter to 'Amr ordering him to come back.

The messenger, 'Uqbah ibn 'Amr, caught up with Amr at Rafah, a little short of the Egyptian frontier. Guessing what might be in the letter, 'Amr ordered the army to quicken its pace. Turning to 'Uqbah, 'Amr said that he would receive the caliph's letter from him when the army had halted after the day's journey. 'Uqbah, unaware of the contents of the letter, agreed and marched along with the army. The army halted for the night at Shajratein, a little valley near the city of El Arish, which 'Amr knew to be beyond the Egyptian border. 'Amr then received and read 'Umar's letter and went on to consult his companions as to the course of action to be adopted. The unanimous view was that as they had received the letter on Egyptian soil, they had permission to proceed.

When 'Umar received the reply, he decided to watch further developments and to start concentrating fresh forces at Madinah that could be dispatched to Egypt as reinforcements. On Eid al-Adha, the Muslim army marched from Shajratein to El Arish, a small town lacking a garrison. The town put up no resistance, and the citizens offered allegiance on the usual terms.

Once in Egypt, the Arab invaders besieged and captured many towns, “slaughtering all before them—men, women, and children. Then a panic fell on all the cities of Egypt, and all their inhabitants took to flight, and made their way to Alexandria.” reported an eyewitness of the invasions. John of Nikiû claims that “Whoever surrendered to the Muslims was slaughtered, and no mercy was shown to the elderly, the women or the children… the Muslims then plundered the possessions of the fleeing Christians, deeming the servants of Christ as enemies of Allah.” John often ends his entries with, “But let us now say no more, for it is impossible to describe the horrors the Muslims committed.”

Conquest of Pelusium and Belbeis
Cyrus of Alexandria had a beautiful daughter named Armenousa, who he desired to marry to Constantine III. Constantine accepted the marriage proposal, so in late 639 Armenousa left Babylon in a grand marriage procession which included two thousand horsemen, along with slaves and a long caravan laden with treasures that served both as dowry and tribute. On her way to Constantine, who was in Caesarea, she heard of the Arab army approaching Egypt and dispatched a regiment of her guards to defend Pelusium, a garrison city considered to be the eastern gateway to Egypt at the time, while she herself remained in Belbeis with more of her guards and sent warnings to her father Cyrus.

In of December 639 or early January 640, the Muslim army reached Pelusium. The siege of the town dragged on for two months. In February 640, an assault group, led by the prominent Huzaifah ibn Wala, successfully captured the fort and city.

The losses incurred by the Muslim army were ameliorated by the number of Sinai Bedouins, who, taking the initiative, had joined them in conquering Egypt. The Bedouins belonged to the tribes of Rashidah and Lakhm.

The ease with which Pelusium fell to the Muslims and the lack of Roman reinforcements during the month-long siege is often attributed to the treachery of Cyrus, who was also the Greek Patriarch of Alexandria (not the one recognised by most of the population, who was Pope Benjamin I).

After the fall of Pelusium, the Muslims marched to Belbeis, 65 km (40 mi) from Memphis via desert roads, and besieged it. Belbeis was the first place in Egypt that the Byzantines showed some measure of resistance towards the Arabs. Two Christian monks, accompanied by Cyrus of Alexandria and the famous Roman general Aretion, came out to negotiate with 'Amr ibn al-'As. Aretion had been the Byzantine governor of Jerusalem and had fled to Egypt when the city fell to the Muslims. 'Amr gave them three options: convert to Islam, pay the jizya, or fight. They requested three days to reflect and then, according to Al-Tabari, requested two extra days.

At the end of the five days, the two monks and the general decided to reject Islam and the jizya and fight the Muslims, thus disobeying Cyrus, who wanted to surrender and pay jizya. Cyrus left for the Babylon Fortress. The battle resulted in a Muslim victory during which Aretion was killed and Armenousa was captured, but sent back to Cyrus. 'Amr ibn al-'As subsequently attempted to convince the native Egyptians to aid the Arabs and surrender the city, based on the kinship between Egyptians and Arabs via Hajar. When the Egyptians refused, the siege resumed until the city fell around the end of March 640.

Siege of Babylon Fortress

Amr had assumed that Egypt would be a pushover but was quickly proven wrong. Even at the outposts of Pelusium and Belbeis, the Muslims had met stiff resistance, with sieges of two and one months, respectively. As Babylon, near what is now Cairo, was a larger and more important city, resistance on a larger scale was expected. The Muslims arrived at Babylon some time in May 640.

Babylon was a fortified city, and the Romans had indeed prepared it for a siege. Outside the city, a ditch had been dug, and a large force was positioned in the area between the ditch and the city walls. Early Muslim sources place the strength of the Byzantine force in Babylon at about six times the strength of the Muslim force. For the next two months, fighting remained inconclusive, with the Byzantines repulsing every Muslim assault.

Later the same month, 'Amr sent a detachment to raid the city of Fayoum. The Byzantines had anticipated that and so had strongly guarded the roads that led to the city and had fortified their garrison in the nearby town of Lahun. When the Muslims realised that Fayoum was too strong for them to take, they headed towards the Western Desert, where they looted all the cattle and animals that they could. They subsequently headed to Oxyrhynchus (Per-Medjed), which was defeated and its entire population massacred. The Arabs then noticed that a Roman general, John, with a small group of 50 men, had been following them. John and his men ran away, but their hiding place was betrayed by a Bedouin chief and they were all killed. Hermann Zotenberg identifies this John with the John, Duke of Barca or Barciana mentioned by Nicephorus. He had brought the Ecthesis and a portion of the True Cross from Patriarch Sergius to Cyrus.

When news of John's death reached Augustalis Theodorus, the commander of the garrison at Babylon, ‘his lamentations were more grievous than the lamentations of David over Saul when he said: 'How are the mighty fallen, and the weapons of war perished!'’ as John of Nikiu puts it. Anastasius, prefect of Arcadia Aegypti, and Theodosius, prefect of Alexandria, arrived from Nikiû with cavalrymen to reinforce the garrison at Babylon, and from Babylon a further force was sent under the command of Leontius to Fayoum. The Arabs attempted, but failed, to take Fayoum, then returned to Lower Egypt down the River Nile. Theodore sent men to search for the body of John, which was found in the Nile, retrieved with a net, embalmed with honour and sent to Heraclius. Heraclius, moved by the general's death, expressed displeasure with Theodorus. Theodorus felt that Anastasius and Theodosius blamed him for the death of John, and formed an enmity with them.

Reinforcements from Madinah
In July, 'Amr wrote to 'Umar requesting reinforcements, but before the letter reached him, the caliph had already dispatched 4,000 men, mostly veterans of the Syrian campaigns, to bolster Amr's strength. Even with the reinforcements, 'Amr was unsuccessful and so, by August, 'Umar had assembled another 4,000-strong force, consisting of four columns, each of 1,000 elite men. Zubayr ibn al-Awwam, a renowned warrior and commander, veteran of the Battle of Yarmouk and once a part of Khalid ibn al-Walid's elite mobile guard, was appointed the supreme commander of the army.

'Umar had also offered Zubayr the chief command and governorship of Egypt, but Zubayr had declined. The column commanders included Miqdad ibn al-Aswad, 'Ubaidah ibn as-Samit and Kharijah ibn Hudhaifah. The reinforcements arrived at Babylon sometime in September 640, bringing the total strength of the Muslim force to 12,000, still quite modest.

It is said that a Coptic soldier, seeing the size of the Muslim force, expressed amazement that such a small force could stand against the Emperor's army, whereto another soldier replied that Arabs could not yield, and had to either emerge victorious or die to the last man. In another anecdote, some Roman soldiers refused to fight, saying 'We have small chance against the men who have conquered Chosroes and Caesar in Syria.'

Battle of Heliopolis

When Zubayr arrived, he pointed out to ‘Amr that the Roman-garrisoned city of Heliopolis was a short distance away, and that troops from there could relieve the Siege of Babylon. To remove this threat, ‘Amr went with about half of his men there.

The Muslim army reached Heliopolis, 15 km (10 mi) from Babylon, in July 640. The city boasted the Sun Temple of the Pharaohs and grandiose monuments and learning institutions. There was the danger that forces from Heliopolis could attack the Muslims from the flank while they were engaged with the Roman army at Babylon.

There was a cavalry clash near the current neighbourhood of Abbaseya. The engagement was not decisive, but it resulted in the occupation of the fortress located between the current neighborhoods of Abdyn and Azbakeya. The defeated Byzantine soldiers retreated to either the Babylon Fortress or the fortress of Nikiû. Zubayr and some of his handpicked soldiers scaled the Heliopolis city wall at an unguarded point and, after overpowering the guards, opened the gates for the army to enter the city. After the capture of Heliopolis, 'Amr and returned to Babylon.

Conquering of Fayoum and Babylon

When news of the Muslims' victory at Heliopolis reached Fayoum, its governor, Domentianus, and his troops fled without informing the people of Fayoum and Abuit that they were abandoning their cities to the enemy. When news reached 'Amr, he sent troops across the Nile to invade Fayoum and Abuit, capturing the entire province of Fayoum without any resistance and massacring its inhabitants.

The Byzantine garrison at Babylon had grown bolder than ever before and had begun to sally forth across the ditch but with little success. The stalemate was broken when the Muslim commanders devised an ingenious strategy, inflicting heavy casualties on the Byzantine forces by encircling them from three sides during one of their sallies. The Byzantines were able to retreat back to the fort, but were left too weak for any further offensive action, forcing them to negotiate. The Byzantine general, Theodorus, shifted his headquarters to the Isle of Rauda, and Cyrus of Alexandria, popularly known as Muqawqis in Muslim history, entered into negotiations with the Muslims.

Emissaries were exchanged between Theodorus and 'Amr, leading to 'Amr meeting Theodorus in person. Then, with negotiations stalled, during the night of 20 December, a company of handpicked warriors, led by Zubayr, managed to scale the wall, kill the guards, and open the gates for the Muslim army to enter. The city was captured by the Muslims the following morning with tactics similar to those that had been used by Khalid ibn Walid at Damascus. However, Theodorus and his army managed to slip away to the island of Rauda during the night, whence they continued to fight the Muslims.

The final assault of the Muslims was on Good Friday, April 6 641, and by Easter Monday the Roman troops had evacuated and began marching to Nikiû. The Romans were given a few days to evacuate so they might celebrate Easter. Many Copts who were imprisoned in Babylon, either for refusing to accept Chalcedon or on suspicion of treachery, were released from prison by the Romans, but Eudocianus, the brother of Domentianus, had them scourged and their hands cut off. The Siege of Babylon had lasted seven months.

According to al-Tabari, upon seeing the Arabs in rags during the fall of Babylon, some Coptic soldiers remarked 'Alas! why did we not know that the Arabs were in such an evil plight? For we would have continued the struggle, and not delivered the city.' When ‘Amr heard of this, he invited some of them to a feast, in which he had a camel killed, boiled its flesh in salt water, and then served it before Muslims and Copts. The Muslims ate the meat, but the Copts turned away in disgust and went home dinnerless. The next day ‘Amr ordered his cooks to search the nearest town for every dainty and delicious dish they could find, and invited the same group over for another feast. When they had finished eating, ‘Amr said to the Copts 'I must have for you all the regard which our kinship imposes. But I understand that you are plotting to take up arms once more against me. Now aforetime the Arabs ate camel's meat, as you saw yesterday; but now when they have discovered all this dainty fare that you see before you, do you think that they will surrender this city? I tell you they will give their lives first; they will fight to the death. Do not therefore hurl yourselves to destruction. Either embrace the religion of Islâm, or pay your tribute, and go your ways to your villages.'

Surrender of Thebaid (Southeastern Egypt)
According to Al-Maqrizi, during the siege of Babylon, Cyrus sent 'Amr an envoy, including the Chalcedonian Bishop of Babylon, with the message 'You and your army have invaded our country, and seem bent on fighting us. Your stay in the land is long, no doubt: but you are a small force, far outnumbered by the Romans, who are well-equipped and well-armed. Now too you are surrounded by the waters of the Nile, and are in fact captives in our hand. It would be well for you therefore to send envoys with any proposals you wish to make for an agreement, before the Romans overwhelm you. Then it will be too late, and you will regret your error.' 'Amr detained them for two days, during which they were allowed to go about and observe the Arab camp, and then sent them back with the message 'Only one of three courses is open to you; (1) Islam with brotherhood and equality; (2) payment of tribute, and protection with an inferior status; (3) war till God decides between us.' When they returned to Babylon, they reported, 'We have seen a people who prefer death to life and humility to pride. They sit in the dust, and they take their meals on horseback. Their commander is one of themselves: there is no distinction of rank among them. They have fixed hours of prayer at which all pray, first washing their hands and feet, and they pray with reverence.'

Later, on Cyrus's request, ‘Amr sent ten officers led by Ubadah ibn al-Samit. When Cyrus saw Ubadah, who was black, he exclaimed 'Take away that black man: I can have no discussion with him.' But the Arabs explained that Ubadah was one of their most trusted leaders, that ‘Amr had personally commissioned him, and that they treat black men equally. Ubadah then explained 'There are a thousand blacks, as black as myself, among our companions. I and they would be ready each to meet and fight a hundred enemies together. We live only to fight for God, and to follow His will. We care nought for wealth, so long as we have wherewithal to stay our hunger and to clothe our bodies. This world is nought to us, the world is all.' Moved by his piety, Cyrus turned to his companions and said 'Do you hear this? I much fear that God has sent these men to devastate the world,' and then to Ubadah 'I have listened, good sir, to your account of yourself and your comrades, and I understand why your arms so far have ailed. I know too that the Romans have failed by caring overmuch for earthly things. But now they are preparing to send against you immense numbers of well-armed battalions. Resistance will be hopeless. But for the sake of peace, we will agree to pay sum of money at the rate of two dinârs a head for every man in the Arab army, a hundred dinârs for your commander, and a thousand for your Caliph, on condition that you return to your own country.' Ubadah replied, 'Do not deceive yourselves. We are not afraid of your numbers. Our greatest desire is to meet the Romans in battle. If we conquer them, it is well; if not, then we receive the good things of the world to come. Our prayer is for martyrdom in the cause of Islam, not for safe return to wife and children. Our small numbers cause us no fear; for it is written in the Book, 'Many a time hath a small company overcome a great host, by the will of God." Understand, therefore, that we can accept no terms save one of the three conditions which we are ordered by the Caliph to offer you.'

Cyrus and his companions deliberated over which of the three options to choose. They immediately ruled out conversion to Islam, saying 'We cannot abandon the religion of Christ for a religion of which we know nothing.' They also ruled out submission and tribute, arguing that it would be tantamount to slavery, but when Ubadah explained that their persons and property would be respected and their churches and religious practice would be unharmed, it seemed reasonable to Cyrus, who chose that option. But most of his Coptic companions were not as willing to give their country over to an invader, and so they attacked the Arab camp a desperate last time. When they were driven back, ‘Amr gave the same three options to Cyrus, who chose surrender and tribute.

Thus, on 22 December, Cyrus of Alexandria entered a treaty with the Muslims, recognizing Muslim sovereignty over the whole of Egypt and effectively over Thebaid, and agreeing to pay Jizya at the rate of 2 diners per male adult. The treaty was subject to the approval of the emperor Heraclius, but Cyrus stipulated that even if the emperor repudiated the treaty, he and the Egyptians, would honour its terms. Cyrus asked Heraclius to ratify the treaty and offered an argument in support. 'Amr submitted a detailed report to Umar recommending ratification. He desired that as soon as the reactions of Heraclius were known, he should be informed so that further necessary instructions could be issued promptly. Upon hearing about this, Heraclius was furious and sent Cyrus a letter full of insults, calling him an abject coward and a heathen and asking whether 100,000 Romans were a match for 12,000 barbarians.

March to Alexandria

The Byzantine commanders, knowing full well that the Muslims' next target was Alexandria, set out to repel the Muslims through continued sallies from the fort or, at least, to exhaust them and erode their morale in a campaign of attrition. In February 641, 'Amr set off for Alexandria from Babylon with his army, encountering defending regiments all along the route. On the third day of their march the Muslims' advance guard encountered a Byzantine detachment at Tarnut on the west bank of the Nile. The Byzantines failed to inflict heavy losses but were able to delay the advance by a full day. The Muslim commanders decided to halt the main army at Tarnut and send an advance guard of cavalry forward to clear the path.

The Muslims came to Kebrias of Abadja, where Domentianus and his soldiers were. He cravenly fled the city in a small boat, leaving his soldiers to their fate. They attempted to follow him, but in the panic the boatmen fled to their home provinces, leaving many of the soldiers stranded. When the Arabs arrived, the soldiers threw their weapons into the water before their enemies, hoping to be spared, but instead they were all massacred. According to John of Nikiu, the only man who lived to tell the tale was a “gallant warrior” named Zacharias. The Muslims then passed by Sais and, finding the family of Theodorus there, killed all of them.

Now  from Tarnut, the Byzantine detachment that had withdrawn from Tarnut the day before joined another that was already at Shareek, and both attacked and routed the Muslim cavalry. The next day, before the Byzantines could annihilate the Muslim advance guard completely, the main Muslim army arrived, prompting the Byzantines to withdraw. The following day, the whole army marched forward without an advance guard. The Muslims reached Sulteis, where they encountered another Byzantine detachment. Hard fighting followed, but the Byzantine resistance soon broke down and they withdrew to Alexandria.

The Muslims halted at Sulteis for a day, still two days' march from Alexandria. After another day's march, the Muslim forces arrived at Kirayun,  from Alexandria. There, the Muslim advance to Alexandria was blocked by a Byzantine force about 20,000 strong. The resulting action remained indecisive for ten days. However, on the tenth day, the Muslims launched a vigorous assault, forcing the defeated Byzantines to retreat to Alexandria. With the way to Alexandria clear, the Muslims reached the capital's outskirts in March.

Conquest of Alexandria and fall of Egypt

The Muslims laid siege to Alexandria in March 641. The city was heavily fortified and provisioned: there were walls within walls and forts within forts. The city also had direct access to the sea by which men and supplies from Constantinople could come at any time.

There was much enmity between the Roman leaders at Alexandria. Theodorus was the commander-in-chief of the Romans in Alexandria, and the only other commander there seems to have been Domentianus. Among the civilians in Alexandria were two men of high rank: the non-Chalcedonian Menas, who was at opposition with Domentianus as both of them competed for power, and Philiades, the brother of Patriarch George I of Alexandria. Domentianus was feuding with both of these men, as well as with Cyrus, his own half-brother. Menas was also furious with Eudocianus for torturing the Coptic prisoners in Babylon. In addition, Theodorus was disgusted by Domentianus’ flight and abandonment of his troops, and took the side of Menas in their dispute. To help with the war effort, Menas recruited all the Greens in Alexandria, while Domentianus recruited all the Blues. These two factions immediately began infighting, and it was with great difficulty that Theodorus managed to stop them. He then demoted Domentianus from his rank of decurion, replacing him with Artana.

As 'Amr surveyed the military situation, he felt that the conquest of Alexandria would be difficult. The Byzantines had high stakes in Alexandria and were determined to offer stiff resistance to the Muslims. They mounted catapults on the walls of the city, and the engines effectively pounded the Muslims with boulders, prompting 'Amr to withdraw out of range. The ensuing battle see-sawed: when the Muslims approached the city, they were pelted with missiles, and, when the Byzantines sallied from the fort, they were invariably beaten back by the Muslims.

It is said that Heraclius, the Byzantine emperor, collected a large army at Constantinople, intending to lead it personally to Alexandria. However, before he could finalize the arrangements, he died. The troops mustered at Constantinople dispersed in the ensuing succession crisis, and no help came to Alexandria, which further demoralized the defenders. The siege dragged on for six months, and in Madinah, 'Umar, got impatient. In a letter addressed to 'Amr, the caliph, concerned at the inordinate delay, appointed 'Ubaidah as field commander to assault the fort. 'Ubaidah's assault was successful, and Alexandria was captured by the Muslims in September. Thousands of Byzantine soldiers were killed or taken captive, and others managed to flee to Constantinople on ships that had been anchored in the port. Some wealthy traders also left.

On behalf of the Egyptians, Cyrus of Alexandria sued for peace, and his request was granted. After the conquest of Egypt, 'Amr is reported to have written to 'Umar, "We have conquered Alexandria. In this city there are 4,000 palaces, 400 places of entertainment, and untold wealth."

On the twentieth of Maskaram (approximately September 18 according to the Julian calendar), the Byzantine general, Theodorus, and all of his troops proceeded to the island of Cyprus, abandoning Alexandria to 'Amr. The conquest represented a huge loss of food and money to the Byzantine Empire and, coupled with the conquest of Syria and the later invasion of the Exarchate of Africa, meant that the Mediterranean, long referred to as the "Roman lake", was now contested between the Muslim Caliphate and the Byzantine Empire. The latter, although sorely tested, would be able to hold on to Anatolia, while the walls of Constantinople would withstand two great Muslim sieges, saving the Byzantines from the fate of the Persian Empire.

Invasion of Nubia
In the summer of 642, 'Amr ibn al-'As sent an expedition to the Christian kingdom of Nubia, which bordered Egypt to the south, under the command of his cousin 'Uqbah ibn Nafi as a pre-emptive raid to announce the arrival of new rulers in Egypt. 'Uqbah ibn Nafi, who later made a great name for himself as the conqueror of Africa and led his horse to the Atlantic, had an unhappy experience in Nubia. No pitched battle was fought, but there were only skirmishes and haphazard engagements, the type of warfare in which the Nubians excelled. They were skilful archers and subjected the Muslims to a merciless barrage of arrows, resulting in 250 Muslims losing their eyes in the engagement.

The Nubian cavalry displayed remarkable speed, even more so than the Muslim cavalry. The Nubians would strike hard and then vanish before the Muslims could recover and counterattack. The hit-and-run raids took their toll on the Muslim expedition. 'Uqbah reported that to 'Amr, who ordered 'Uqbah to withdraw from Nubia, terminating the expedition.

Taxation under Muslim rule
Those who refused to convert to Islam were taxed in the form of money and food for the occupying troops and, in exchange, the taxpayers were excused from military service and left free to observe their religion and to administer their own affairs.

John of Nikiu, a Coptic bishop, wrote a chronicle which provides one of the few non-Muslim accounts of the conquest written by a native of Egypt who was also a near contemporary of the events. He writes of Muslim rule: "And the yoke they laid on the Egyptians was heavier than the yoke which had been laid on Israel by Pharaoh.... When God's judgement lights upon these Muslims, may He do unto them as He did aforetime unto Pharaoh!". Regarding taxation he writes that after the conquest taxes on the native Christians were increased "to the extent of twenty-two batr of gold till all the people hid themselves owing to the greatness of the tribulation, and could not find the wherewithal to pay." Writing particularly as regards the taxation of the people of Alexandria, he notes:
And none could recount the mourning and lamentation which took place in that city: they even gave their children in exchange for the great sums which they had to pay monthly. And they had none to help them, and God destroyed their hopes, and delivered the Christians into the hands of their enemies.

Amr ibn al-As as described by John of Nikiû: “He was a lover of money”; “he doubled the taxes on the peasants”; “he perpetrated innumerable acts of violence”; “he had no mercy on the Egyptians, and did not observe the covenant they had made with him, for he was of a barbaric race”; and “he threatened death to any Copt who concealed treasure.”

When a Coptic Christian asked Amr ibn al-As (who is said to have tortured and killed Coptic Christians that attempted to conceal their wealth) how much jizya his people were to pay, he said, “If you give me all that you own—from the ground to the ceiling—I will still not tell you how much you owe. Instead, you [the Christian Copts] are our treasure chest, so that, if we are in need, you will be in need, and if things are easy for us, they will be easy for you.”

Caliph Uthman recalled Amr, that “willful, greedy, grasping man!” in the words of a contemporary Arab, for not sending enough wealth from Egypt. Amr's replacement increased the caliphate's treasury double that of his predecessor prompting Uthman to boast how he had forced the “milk camels” (reference to Egypt's indigenous Christians) “to yield more milk.”

According to the jurist Abu Yusuf, the Caliph Umar ordered that “Muslims eat them [Coptic Christians] as long as they live; if we perish, the children of our children eat their children.”
 
A Coptic chronicle describes the situation of Egyptian Christians in the 700s:
And out of love for money he [the Muslim governor of Egypt] commanded the governors to put the people to death, and bring him their money; and wrote to them, saying: “I have delivered up to you the lives of the people, therefore collect all the wealth that you can, from bishops or monks or churches or any of the people, and bring stuffs and money and cattle and all that you find belonging to them, and respect no one. And whatever place you visit, pillage it.” Accordingly, the officials laid the country waste and carried off the columns and the woodwork, and sold what was worth ten dinars for one dinar.... ” 

Caliph Sulayman ibn Abd al-Malik wrote to the governor of Egypt and commanded him “to milk the camel [Coptic Christians] even if it stops giving milk but instead gives blood, keep milking until the blood runs dry.” His tax collector, Osama bin Zayd, “used particularly barbarous means to extract money from the Christians. With hot iron bars he impressed a symbol on the body of each taxpayer. If a monk or Christian layman was discovered without the sign, Osama first amputated the victim’s arms and then beheaded him. Many Christians converted to Islam in order to avoid punishment as well as to be freed of tribute. (Islamic scholars agree that there were strong economic motives for conversion)

Many contemporary accounts speak of wholesale extortion followed by starvation: “The dead were cast out into the streets and market-places, like fish which the water throws up on the land, because they found none to bury them; and some of the people devoured human flesh."

Egypt under Muslim rule

Muslims gained control over Egypt by a variety of factors, including internal Byzantine politics, religious zeal and the difficulty of maintaining a large empire. The Byzantines attempted to regain Alexandria, but it was retaken by 'Amr in 646. In 654 an invasion fleet sent by Constans II was repelled. No serious effort was then made by the Byzantines to regain possession of Egypt.

In The Great Arab Conquests, Hugh Kennedy writes that Cyrus, the Roman governor, had exiled the Coptic patriarch, Benjamin. When 'Amr occupied Alexandria, a Coptic nobleman (duqs) called Sanutius persuaded him to send out a proclamation of safe conduct for Benjamin and an invitation to return to Alexandria. When Benjamin arrived, he was then instructed by the governor to resume control over the Coptic Church. He arranged for the restoration of the monasteries in the Wadi Natrun, which had been ruined by the Chalcedonean Christians; four of them still survive as functioning monasteries.

On Benjamin's return, the Egyptian population also worked with him. Kennedy wrote, "The pious biographer of Coptic patriarch Benjamin presents us with the striking image of the patriarch prayed for the success of the Muslim commander Amr against the Christians of the Cyrenaica. Benjamin survived for almost twenty years after the fall of Egypt to the Muslims, dying of full years and honour in 661. His body was laid to rest in the monastery of St Macarius, where he is still venerated as a saint. There can be no doubt that he played a major role in the survival of the Coptic Church". Benjamin also prayed for 'Amr when he attempted to take Libya.

Kennedy also wrote, "Even more striking is the verdict of John of Nikiu. John was no admirer of Muslim government and was fierce in his denunciation, but he says of Amr: 'He extracted the taxes which had been determined upon but he took none of the property of the churches, and he committed no act of spoliation or plunder, and he preserved them throughout all his days.... Of all the early Muslim conquests, that of Egypt was the swiftest and most complete. Within a space of two years the country had come entirely under Arab rule. Even more remarkably, it has remained under Muslim rule ever since. Seldom in history can so massive a political change have happened so swiftly and been so long lasting."

The Coptic Chronicler Severus ibn al-Muqaffa claims that “The Arabs in the land of Egypt had ruined the country.… They burnt the fortresses and pillaged the provinces, and killed a multitude of the saintly monks who were in them and they violated a multitude of the virgin nuns and killed some of them with the sword.”"Egypt had become enslaved to Satan" concludes John of Nikiu.

Uqba ibn Nafi then used Egypt as a launch pad to move across North Africa, all the way to the Atlantic Ocean. Kennedy wrote that when Uqba reached the Atlantic, he is said to have ridden his horse into the sea until the water was below his chest, and then shouted, 'O Lord, if the sea did not stop me, I would go through lands like Alexander the Great, defending your faith'. Kennedy writes further that the image of a warrior whose conquest in the name of God was stopped only by the ocean remains important in the history of the conquests.

Fustat, the new capital
During the Egyptian campaign, Alexandria was the capital of Egypt. When Alexandria was captured by the Muslims, the houses vacated by the Byzantines were occupied by the Muslims, who were impressed and attracted by Alexandria, "the queen of cities". 'Amr wanted Alexandria to remain the capital of Muslim Egypt. He wrote to 'Umar to propose that but 'Umar refused on the basis that Alexandria was a maritime city, and there would always be a danger that the Byzantine Navy would attack. He suggested instead for the capital would be established at a central location further inland, where no mass of water separated it from Arabia. The treaty with Cyrus of Alexandria was followed, and the wealth of the Egyptians in Alexandria was spared and that of Romans and Greeks was taken as booty. Greek citizens were given a choice: return to Greek territories safely without their wealth or stay in Alexandria and pay Jizya. Some chose to stay, and others went to Byzantine lands.

'Amr next proceeded to choose a suitable site for the capital of Egypt, eventually settling on the site where he had pitched his tent at the time of the battle of Babylon, about 400 m (500 yd) northeast of the fort. It is reported that after the battle was over and the army was about to march to Alexandria, the men began to pull down the tent and pack it for the journey, and it was found that a dove had nested on top of the tent and laid eggs. 'Amr ordered that the tent be left standing where it was, where it remained after the army departed. 'Amr took the unusual episode as a sign from Heaven and decided "where the dove laid its nest, let the people build their city, but first let them build a statue of the Virgin Mary."

As 'Amr's tent was to be the focal point of the city, the city was called Fustat, meaning in Arabic "the tent". The first structure to be built was the mosque that later became famous as Mosque of 'Amr ibn al-'As. In the course of time, Fustat extended to include the old town of Babylon to the west, becoming the bustling commercial centre of Egypt.

'Umar's reforms
To consolidate his rule in Egypt, 'Umar imposed the jizya on Egyptians. During later Umayyad rule, higher taxes would be levied. With 'Umar's permission, 'Amr decided to build a canal to join the Nile with the Red Sea to open new markets for Egyptian merchants and an easy route to Arabia and Iraq. The project was presented to 'Umar, who approved it. A canal was dug and, within a few months, was opened for merchants. It was named "Nahar Amir ul-Mu'mineen" (the canal of the Commander of the Faithful), after 'Umar's title. He also enforced the Pact of Umar, whose points were as follows:
Poll-tax should be taken from all men who would not convert to Islam.
 Prohibition against building new churches, places of worship, monasteries, monks or a new cell. (Hence it was also forbidden to build new synagogues. A similar law, prohibiting the build of new synagogues, existed in the Byzantine Empire, and was therefore not new for all Jews. It was new for the Christians. However, in parts of the Caliphate, new synagogues were built after the occupation of Islamic forces, for example in Jerusalem and Ramle.)
 Prohibition against rebuilding destroyed churches, by day or night, in their own neighbourhoods or those situated in the quarters of the Muslims.
 The worship places of non-Muslims must be lower in elevation than the lowest mosque in town.
 The houses of non-Muslims must not be taller in elevation than the houses of Muslims.
 Prohibition against hanging a cross on the Churches.
 Muslims should be allowed to enter churches (for shelter) in any time, both in day and night.
 Obliging the call of prayer by a bell or a kind of Gong (Nakos) to be low in volume.
 Prohibition of Christians and Jews against raising their voices at prayer times.
 Prohibition against teaching non-Muslim children the Qur'an.
 Christians were forbidden to show their religion in public, or to be seen with Christian books or symbols in public, on the roads or in the markets of the Muslims.
 Palm Sunday and Easter parades were banned.
 Funerals should be conducted quietly.
 Prohibition against burying non-Muslim dead near Muslims.
 Prohibition against raising a pig next to a Muslims neighbor.
 Christians were forbidden to sell Muslims alcoholic beverages.
 Christians were forbidden to provide cover or shelter for spies.
 Prohibition against telling a lie about Muslims.
 Obligation to show deference toward Muslims. If a Muslim wishes to sit, a non-Muslim should be rise from his seats and let the Muslim sit.
 Prohibition against preaching to Muslims in an attempt to convert them from Islam. 
 Prohibition against preventing the conversion to Islam of some one who wants to convert.
 The appearance of the non-Muslims has to be different from those of the Muslims: Prohibition against wearing Qalansuwa (kind of dome that was used to wear by Bedouin), Bedouin turban (Amamh), Muslims shoes, and Sash to their waists. As to their heads, it was forbidden to comb the hair sidewise as the Muslim custom, and they were forced to cut the hair in the front of the head. Also non-Muslim shall not imitate the Arab-Muslim way of speech nor shall adopt the kunyas (Arabic byname, such as "abu Khattib").
 Obligation to identify non-Muslims as such by clipping the heads' forelocks and by always dressing in the same manner, wherever they go, with binding the zunnar (a kind of belt) around the waists. Christians to wear blue belts or turbans, Jews to wear yellow belts or turbans, Zoroastrians to wear black belts or turbans, and Samaritans to wear red belts or turbans.
 Prohibition against riding animals in the Muslim custom, and prohibition against riding with a saddle.
 Prohibition against adopting a Muslim title of honour.
 Prohibition against engraving Arabic inscriptions on signet seals.
 Prohibition against any possession of weapons.
 Non-Muslims must host a Muslim passerby for at least 3 days and feed him.
 Non-Muslims prohibited from buying a Muslim prisoner.
 Prohibition against taking slaves who have been allotted to Muslims.
 Prohibition against non-Muslims to lead, govern or employ Muslims.
 If a non-Muslim beats a Muslim (even in self defense), his Dhimmi protection is removed. 
 In return, the ruler would provide security for the Christian believers who follow the rules of the pact.

See also
Aegyptus (Roman province)
Muslim conquests
Byzantine-Arab Wars
Umayyad conquest of North Africa
Spread of Islam

References

Bibliography

External links
 
 

 
640s conflicts
7th century in Egypt
Islam in Egypt
Roman Egypt
Byzantine Empire
Arab–Byzantine wars